Vrubivskyi is an urban-type settlement in Luhansk Raion (district) in Luhansk Oblast of eastern Ukraine. Population:

Demographics
Native language distribution as of the Ukrainian Census of 2001:
 Ukrainian: 26.24%
 Russian: 73.25%
 Others: 0.17%

References

Urban-type settlements in Luhansk Raion